Events in the year 2019 in Tonga.

Incumbents
 Monarch: Tupou VI
 Prime Minister: ʻAkilisi Pōhiva (until 12 September), Semisi Sika (acting, from 12 September until 8 October), Pohiva Tuʻiʻonetoa (from 8 October)

Events

October

 Metis Shoal, a volcanic island at the top of a submarine volcano between Kao and Late disappears during an eruption which is first reported on the morning of 14 October. A new and bigger island appears nearby.

Deaths
12 September – ʻAkilisi Pōhiva, Prime Minister (b. 1941).

References

 
Years of the 21st century in Tonga
Tonga
Tonga
2010s in Tonga